New Paris may refer to a place in the United States:

New Paris, Indiana
New Paris, Ohio
New Paris, Pennsylvania
New Paris, Wisconsin

See also
Paris
New France